Anne Borch Paulin (born 5 January 1988 in Skive) is a Danish politician, who is a member of the Folketing for the Social Democrats political party. She was elected into parliament at the 2019 Danish general election.

Political career
Paulin served as substitute member of the Folketing from 2 February 2016 to 3 June 2016, substituting for Thomas Jensen. She was elected into parliament at the 2019 election, where she received 6,814 personal votes.

References

External links 
 Biography on the website of the Danish Parliament (Folketinget)

1988 births
Living people
People from Skive Municipality
Social Democrats (Denmark) politicians
21st-century Danish women politicians
Women members of the Folketing
Members of the Folketing 2019–2022
Members of the Folketing 2022–2026